Global University Somalia. (GU), Mogadishu
 Al-Imra International University (AIU), Mogadishu
 Benadir University, Mogadishu 

 Accord University, Mogadishu 

 Indian Ocean University (IOU), Mogadishu
 Nile University of Science and Technology (NUST), Mogadishu, Beledweyne, Garoowe, Galkacyo
 Jobkey University (JU), Mogadishu, Hiiraan, Garoowe and Afgooye
 Mogadishu University, Mogadishu
 Green Hope University (GHU) Mogadishu, Baardheere, Guriceel, Beledweyne
 Somali International University, Mogadishu
 Super University of Somalia, Mogadishu

 Somali National University, Mogadishu
 Himilo University, Mogadishu

 University of Somalia (UNISO), Mogadishu
 Imam University(IU) Mogadishu and Gedo
 Daha international university ( DIU) Mogadishu
Baidoa International University (BIU) Baidoa
 Sombridge university, Mogadishu
 Nile university of science and technology, Mogadishu
 Zamzam University of Science and Technology, Mogadishu

Baidoa 
 GANANY University, Baidoa and SouthWest
 Ganany University, Baidoa

Bari 
 East Africa University, Bosaso and Qardho
 University of Health Sciences, Bosaso
 Mogadishu University (Puntland branch), Bosaso
 Red Sea University (RSU) Bosaaso
 Sahal University, Bosaso

Gedo
 Bardera Polytechnic, Bardera
 University of Gedo, Bardera
Bismo Professional College (Luuq)

Lower Juba
 Kismayo University

Nugal
 East Africa University, Garowe
 Puntland State University, Garowe
 Green Hope University, Garoowe

Mudug
 East Africa University, Galkayo and Galdogob
 Puntland State University, Galkayo
 Nile university of science and technology, Galkayo

Hiiraan
 Nile university of science and technology, Beledweyne
 Green Hope University, Beledweyne

Somalia education-related lists
Somalia
Somalia